The 1953 Vanderbilt Commodores football team represented Vanderbilt University as a member of the Southeastern Conference (SEC) during the 1953 college football season. Led by first-year head coach Art Guepe, the Commodores compiled an overall record of 3–7 with a mark of 1–5 in conference play, trying for tenth place in the SEC.

Schedule

References

Vanderbilt
Vanderbilt Commodores football seasons
Vanderbilt Commodores football